Grant Street railway station is a railway station on the Transperth network. It is located on the Fremantle line, 11.1 kilometres from Perth station serving the suburb of Cottesloe.

History
Grant Street station opened in 1954. The station closed on 1 September 1979 along with the rest of the Fremantle line, re-opening on 29 July 1983 when services were restored.

Following the introduction of four-carriage trains on 18 August 2002, services could not stop at Grant Street due to the platform lengths with alternative road transport provided. In May 2009, work was completed at the station to extend the platforms, and four-carriage trains now stop at the station.

Services
Grant Street station is served by Transperth Fremantle line services from Fremantle to Perth that continue through to Midland via the Midland line.

Grant Street station saw 85,036 passengers in the 2013–14 financial year.

Platforms
Grant Street has two platforms: platform 1 has Perth-bound trains; platform 2 has Fremantle-bound trains.

References

External links

Cottesloe, Western Australia
Fremantle line
Railway stations in Perth, Western Australia
Railway stations in Australia opened in 1954